Drive to the Starry Road is the third Korean-language studio album by South Korean boy band Astro, released on May 16, 2022, through Fantagio Music. It was released alongside the music video for the lead single "Candy Sugar Pop". The album debuted at number one on the Gaon Album Chart and number 10 on the Oricon Albums Chart. It was the group's last album to feature Rocky, who withdrew from the group on the last day of February 2023.

Commercial performance
Drive to the Starry Road topped the Gaon Retail Album Chart in its first week of release, selling 142,379 copies in retail stores across South Korea.

Track listing

Charts

Weekly charts

Monthly charts

Year-end charts

References

2022 albums
Astro (South Korean band) albums
Korean-language albums